Ian Ernest Craib (12 December 1945 – 22 December 2002) was an English sociologist and psychotherapist.

He was educated at Trinity School of John Whitgift, and the South Bank Polytechnic, eventually receiving his doctorate at the Victoria University of Manchester. He went on to join the University of Essex in 1973, eventually rising to the chair of Professor of Sociology. During his time at the University, he gained an international reputation in sociology, and is widely read as a theoretician who ably links sociology and psychoanalysis.

In the mid-1980s, he received qualification as a psychotherapist and group analyst, bringing together his interests in the reciprocal effects between individuals, groups and societies. In the late 1980s he was central — along with Karl Figlio, Joan Busfield, Ken Plummer and John Walshe — to the creation of a master's degree in Sociology and Psychotherapy, organised jointly by the University of Essex and the Mental Health Trust. This was one of the first university courses of its type in the country, combining clinical experience with theoretical thinking.

Craib's working-class origins influenced his understanding of class systems and the politics of power, and this partly explains his attachment in his late teens to Trotskyite parties. He later rejected them, however, because of their authoritarianism. Unfair treatment and unequal distribution of power and influence angered him. In the psychoanalytic field he encouraged the sharing of the difficulties, pain, joy and fun of group psychotherapeutic work. The need to get things right, the wonder at how interpretations were so often lost and ignored, the question of whether one should be working with the deep unconscious in therapeutic groups or making comments at the overt conscious level were constant themes that he brought to discussions.

He died of cancer on 22 December 2002, at the age of 57.

Bibliography
 Existentialism and Sociology - a Study of Jean-Paul Sartre, Cambridge University Press, 1976
 Modern Social Theory - from Parsons to Habermas, Harvester-Wheatsheaf, London, 1984 
 Psychoanalysis and Social Theory: The Limits of Sociology, Harvester Wheatsheaf, 1989
 Modern Social Theory: from Parsons to Habermas Harlow: Pearson, 1992
 Anthony Giddens, Routledge, 1992
 The Importance of Disappointment, Routledge, 1994
 Classical Social Theory, Oxford, 1997
 Experiencing Identity, Sage, 1998

External links
 Obituary - The Guardian
 Obituary - The Times

1945 births
2002 deaths
British sociologists
British psychotherapists
Academics of the University of Essex
Alumni of the Victoria University of Manchester
Alumni of London South Bank University